The Lithuania men's national volleyball team represents Lithuania in international men's volleyball competitions and friendly matches.

History
Although volleyball was always regularly played in Lithuania, both men's and women's national teams were inactive for a long time. In 2014 the Lithuania men's national volleyball team participated in 2015 Men's European Volleyball Championship qualification tournament and it was the first Lithuanian team international appearance after 20 years of absence.

References

External links 
Lithuanian Volleyball Federation

Volleyball
National men's volleyball teams
Volleyball in Lithuania
Men's sport in Lithuania